Gabriel Shaoolian (born April 21, 1972) is a digital trends expert and the founder and CEO of the digital agency Digital Silk. He previously founded the New York City digital agency Blue Fountain Media.

Career

Shaoolian began his career as a graphic designer in 1995, working out of his small apartment in New York City. From there, he moved on to positions with various digital start-ups, including Zeborg, where he was head of Interactive Design from 1998 to 2000.

In 2001, he started an independent career, as a freelance web designer. Shaoolian founded in 2003 his own website development and online marketing company, under the name Gabriel Productions, later re-branded in 2005 as Blue Fountain Media. At first, the company functioned as Shaoolian's self-employed freelancer business. He focused on the effectiveness of brand marketing, studying user behavior, website bounce rate, individual pages performance. Based on these observations, he created marketing strategies identifying the specific audience and the value offered to this audience through a clear message, both on the business website and on social platforms.

After building a portfolio of successful projects, the effectiveness of his approach became better known and the company expanded. Shaoolian managed to expand the company without taking loans or investment money. Blue Fountain Media developed websites and online strategies for clients like Procter & Gamble, NASA, HarperCollins Publishers, AT&T, Nike, the United Nations, Canon, and the National Football League.

In 2019, Shaoolian founded Digital Silk, a global digital agency, to continue growing brands online through services ranging from web design and development to digital marketing.

Digital trends expertise writing

Shaoolian is a regular contributor to The New York Times, Huffington Post, and Forbes on digital business topics. He is also featured in other media coverage on similar topics (like The Washington Post, CNN Tech, Reuters or Bloomberg TV).

Personal life
Gabriel Shaoolian is a graduate of New York University, and lives in New York City with his wife and children. He enjoys working on his digital comic book project, Biowars. He serves advisory roles for the New York Organ Donor Association, Save the Children and Gift of Life.

Biowars
Biowars is a digital comic series and set of app games created by Gabriel Shaoolian and published by Gabriel Creations, Inc. A mixture of science and science fiction, Shaoolian developed the idea for Biowars after studying endocrinology at New York University, where he became interested in the human body and its immune system.

Publication history 
The first issue of Biowars, titled "Infection", appeared in November 2013. Written by Mark Powers, who also worked at Marvel Comics and Devil's Due, the comic introduced a number of human characters living in New York, in addition to heroes and villains who possess both curative and virulent qualities.

Subsequent issues have since been released on a monthly or bimonthly basis, with its twelfth and latest issue, named "Cosmic Will", released in March 2016.

Storyline 
The story of Biowars centers on Alex Hawking, a student living in Manhattan who is inadvertently passed the Z-Kron pathogen by his father, who then dies from exposure to the biological agent. After receiving the germ, Alex joins up with a reporter who is writing a story on the deadly germ's creators, known as The Combine.

The virus, which Nerd Reactor says is "designed to annihilate the human immune system: a far more efficient and untraceable version of an assassin's bullet," then takes readers inside Alex's immune system, or BioCosmos.

Moving between New York and inside Alex Hawking's body, readers are introduced to characters from The Combine who are searching for Alex, as well as heroes, biological mutants and microbes in humanoid form living inside of Alex.

Reception 
Since its publication, writers at comic-related websites have published numerous critical reviews of Biowars. Recognizing its scientific angle and concept, Wired wrote this of the comic, "Anthropomorphized immune and nervous system cells in mortal combat? Yes please! Perfect for converting kids from comic nerds to science nerds."

In the Burning Blogger of Bedlam, the author wrote of Biowars''' concept, "It is a fascinating concept right from the get-go and one with rich potential. To my knowledge, the inner world of the biological landscape isn't something that has been explored much in comic books (if at all). So right away, I felt like I was experiencing something fresh and new."

Pirate Jenny, of the site Black Girl Nerds, said of the art and themes in Biowars, "With gorgeously detailed illustrations and a creative take on well-known themes including humanity and justice, Biowars delivers an interesting and entertaining story."

In September 2015, Biowars reported to have gained a following of 126,000 Facebook fans and readers leading up to its second year of publication.

 Games 
In 2015 the digital comic released a Facebook game and series of mobile gaming apps that allow fans to interact with characters and storylines from the series.Biowars: Blastor's Saga is a side-scrolling shooter where players become the Biowarrior Blastor and use the character's Antibody Cannons and cyto-skeletal armor to attack enemies.Biowars: Invisible War is a side-scrolling shooter that allows users to play as a Biowars hero against invading pathogens with the help of another BioWarrior while avoiding in-game terrain.Biowars: Phagien's Quest is a side-scrolling shooter where users play as the Macrophage Commander Phagien against viruses and microbes inside the human body.Biowars: Swipe 'N Slash'' is a game similar to Fruit Ninja, where users select different BioWarriors to defeat microbial threats inside the human body.

References

External links
 Official webpage

Living people
1973 births
American columnists
The New York Times columnists
New York University alumni
American technology chief executives